Hotel Adler is a traditional hotel located in the Old Town of Murten, Fribourg canton, Switzerland, the first written record about it is from 1396.

The hotel was visited by many famous people including:

1471 - Jacques of Savoy, Count of Romont
1476 - Adrian von Bubenberg
1760 - Casanova
1786 - Johann Wolfgang von Goethe.
In 2012 the building was renovated and all rooms were decorated by an artist.

See also 
List of oldest companies

References

External links 
Homepage
Location on Google Maps

Hotels in Switzerland
Restaurants in Switzerland
Murten
Companies established in the 14th century
14th-century establishments in Switzerland
Hotels established in the 14th century